Abderahman Samir (Arabic:عبد الرحمن سمير) (born 26 March 1987) is a Qatari born-Egyptian footballer. He currently plays for Mesaimeer as a midfielder .

Career
He plays at the Mesaimeer since 2010 .

External links

References

Living people
1987 births
Qatari footballers
Qatari people of Egyptian descent
Naturalised citizens of Qatar
Mesaimeer SC players
Qatar Stars League players
Qatari Second Division players
Association football midfielders
Place of birth missing (living people)